In enzymology, a N-methyl nucleosidase is an enzyme that catalyzes the chemical reaction

7-methylxanthosine + H2O  7-methylxanthine + D-ribose

Thus, the two substrates of this enzyme are 7-methylxanthosine and H2O, whereas its two products are 7-methylxanthine and D-ribose.

This enzyme belongs to the family of hydrolases, specifically those glycosylases that hydrolyse N-glycosyl compounds.  The systematic name of this enzyme class is 7-methylxanthosine ribohydrolase. Other names in common use include 7-methylxanthosine nucleosidase, N-MeNase, N-methyl nucleoside hydrolase, and methylpurine nucleosidase.

References

 

EC 3.2.2
Enzymes of unknown structure